Frank Palmer may refer to:

Frank Palmer (rugby union) (1896–1925), Welsh rugby union player
Frank R. Palmer (1922–2019), British linguist, linguistic researcher and lecturer
Frank Palmer (musician) on California
Frank Palmer (Australian footballer) (1925–1970), Australian rules footballer for South Melbourne
Frank Palmer (businessman) (born 1940), Canadian advertising executive

See also
Francis Palmer (disambiguation)
Frank A. Palmer and Louise B. Crary (shipwreck), an 1897 historic dual shipwreck site
Frank Palmer Speare (1869–1954), first president of Northeastern University